Andrey Pavlovich Bakhvalov (born 13 April 1963) is a Russian speed skater. He competed at the 1988 Winter Olympics, the 1992 Winter Olympics and the 1994 Winter Olympics.

References

External links
 

1963 births
Living people
Russian male speed skaters
Olympic speed skaters of the Soviet Union
Olympic speed skaters of the Unified Team
Olympic speed skaters of Russia
Speed skaters at the 1988 Winter Olympics
Speed skaters at the 1992 Winter Olympics
Speed skaters at the 1994 Winter Olympics
Speed skaters from Moscow